Liang En-shuo won the girls' singles title at the 2018 Australian Open, defeating Clara Burel in the final, 6–3, 6–4.

Marta Kostyuk was the defending champion, but withdrew as she was still competing in the women's tournament.

Seeds

Draw

Finals

Top half

Section 1

Section 2

Bottom half

Section 3

Section 4

Qualifying

Seeds

Qualifiers

Lucky loser

Draw

First qualifier

Second qualifier

Third qualifier

Fourth qualifier

Fifth qualifier

Sixth qualifier

Seventh qualifier

Eighth qualifier

External links
 Main draw at ausopen.com
 Draw at itftennis.com

Girls' Singles
Australian Open, 2018 Girls' Singles
Aust
Aust